Hassan Saeed (Dhivehi: ޑރ. ޙަސަން ސަޢީދު) was the former Attorney General of the Republic of Maldives, a role in which he served from November 11, 2003 to August 5, 2007, and is the current managing partner of Chambers Inn, a corporate law firm. He is also the Managing Director of Premier Property Pvt Ltd, the a real estate management, sales, and rental company.

Prior to establishing his own law firm and his transition into the world of real estate and corporate law, Saeed led a long political and legal career in the government of the Republic of Maldives. In 1996, he served as a State Attorney, and after completing his doctorate in law at the University of Queensland and serving as the Chief Judge of the Criminal Court and the Juvenile Court, was appointed to the position of Attorney General of the Republic of Maldives in 2003, a position in which he served until mid-2007.

As the Attorney General, Saeed served as the chief legal advisor to the Maldivian government and led a long series of reforms to completely overhaul the country's politico-legal system and transform it into that of a functional liberal democracy. These reforms took much of their inspiration from the legal systems of modern Western democracies while maintaining a deep connection to Islamic law and local traditions.

In June 2007, Saeed resigned from the post of the Attorney General, arguing that the government was not sincere in the reform process and was slowing and even trying to reverse the reform process.

In the country’s first ever multiparty democratic election, Saeed contested as an independent candidate and came third on an agenda of clean, transparent governance and reform .

He also served as an advisor to two different presidents: President Mohamed Nasheed, from 2008 to 2009, and President Mohammed Waheed Hassan from 2012 to 2013.

Over the years, Saeed was responsible for drafting some 24 Bills for government agencies and political parties.

After serving in the Maldivian government for many years, Saeed turned to the world of corporate law and real estate (management, sales, rental, and development). Today, Saeed an expert on Maldivian real estate law and management and has liaised with the country’s leading developers from the first ever condominium built in the country in 2009.

Education
A recognized scholar and lifelong student, Saeed did not receive any kind of formal schooling. At the age of 10 he was enrolled in Jamiah Salafiyaa – a highly conservative Islamic theology madrasa in Pakistan where he studied classic Islamic studies for 7 years in Urdu and Arabic language.  In 1988 he joined a pre-university program at the Islamic University of Malaysia, where he spent initial two years learning the English language from scratch before embarking on his legal education.

Saeed earned a Doctor of Philosophy degree from the University of Queensland in 2003, alongside a Master of Comparative Law from International Islamic University in 1997 and a Bachelor of Law with Honours from the same institution in 1995.

Saeed’s masters and doctoral thesis focused on constitutional law with a particular emphasis on free speech.

Academic Life 
He has lectured in law faculties at multiple respected international universities, including his alma mater, the University of Queensland. He is also an Islamic scholar that has written on liberal Islam, having co-authored a book on the subject entitled “Freedom of Religion, Apostasy, and Islam” with Professor Abdullah Saeed of University of Melbourne, and assisted Professor Keith Fletcher in updating “Partnership Law in Australia and New Zealand” – a leading textbook on the subject. He also authored a number of books and reports on the Maldives rights and democracy, some of which include “Democracy Betrayed Behind the Mask of The Island President”; “Lies, Misleading and Untold Truth”; and “Male International Airport Long-term Lease to GMR Company – Challenges and Losses thereof”.

He also was a partner in a project for the introduction of Islamic Law at the University of Queensland – a subject which he went on to teach as well. He assisted in designing course outlines for “The Methodology of Islamic Law” – a postgraduate course, for University of Melbourne, Australia.

Today Saeed owns and operates (free-of-charge) the country’s largest and most comprehensive legal database "www.gaanoon.com"– a project on which he has spent personal time and money since its inception in 2012. As part of the project Saeed has, for the first time in the country’s history, provided the following:

 All laws, regulations, decrees, and bylaws from a single source.
 The most authoritative and comprehensive legal dictionary.
 Consolidated all the laws.

Membership/Professional Qualification 
Saeed is a registered Barrister-at-Law in the High Court of Australia and a registered Advocator and Solicitor in the Supreme Court of Maldives. He served as a member of the Maldives Constitutional Assembly, Chairman of the National Law Commission and Member of the Judicial Service Commission. Briefly he served as a Member of the Board of Governors of International Islamic University Malaysia. He served as the Vice-President of People Party (Dhivehi Rayyithunge Party) and later he founded and served as the President of the Maldives National Party (Dhivehi Qaumi Party).

Reforms
As the Attorney General of the Republic of Maldives and as the Chief Judge of the Criminal Court and Juvenile Court in the Maldives, Saeed introduced many groundbreaking reforms that addressed and sought an end to a long history of human rights abuses and abuses of power in the Maldivian legal system.

Reforms as the Chief Judge 
Saeed introduced several steps enhancing rights of defendants. These include access to legal representation, access to evidence, medical examinations at the court’s expense in case of alleged torture or physical violence, and barring handcuffed defendants (unless violent).

On the administrative side, Saeed introduced sentencing guidelines, computerized the country’s 25-year-old criminal records, and created the first ever self-funded medica insurance scheme for the judges of his courts.

Saeed’s appointment as the Chief Judge of the Criminal Court and the Juvenile Court at the height of the 25-year authoritarian rule of President Gayyoom, a period in which citizens lacked very basic human rights, 97% of convictions were based on confessions, judges were hired and fired at the will of the executive branch, and judges lacked mandates for such reform initiatives. In this historical context, Saeed’s reforms were unprecedented and substantial.

Reforms as the Attorney General 
Saeed used his position as the Attorney General of the country to revolutionize the protection of human rights and the enhancement of legal-political rights and institutional reforms.

His formal legal opinion on citizens’ rights to form political parties paved the way for the first ever formation and registration of political parties with legislative and financial backing by the state. He also headed the establishment of the country’s first Human Rights Commission and provided a detailed legislative framework for it. Drawing from his postgraduate research, Saeed extended maximum protection for free speech by bringing an end to the criminal prosecution of reporters and editors by decriminalizing defamation, subsequently providing protection for whistleblowers.

On the criminal justice side, Saeed introduced the National Criminal Justice Reform Plan. The crown jewel of the Plan was the introduction of a modern Penal Code that is in accord with classic Islamic law and local customary practices while, by and large, complying with Western and international norms.

In a series of phases, he also replaced the confession-based investigation, prosecution, and conviction system with that of an evidence-based system. These included access to legal counsel during investigation, audio-video recording of investigations, introduction of arrestable and non-arrestable offences, habeas corpus, a bail system, separation of police from military, and the establishment of police oversight mechanisms. He also opened the country’s prison systems to domestic and international human rights bodies such as Amnesty International, the Red Cross, the Human Rights Commission of the Maldives, and parliamentary and judiciary committees

In the judicial reform, Saeed spearheaded the establishment of the Judicial Service Commission for overseeing judges (as opposed to the President and the Justice Minister). He started a program to replace old untrained judges with Western-educated law graduates. He ensured the selection of an equal number of male and female students – which eventually became the catalyst for the appointment of the first ever female judges in the country against the outcry of conservative religious groups.

Saeed also discarded the old rules requiring government written consent for citizens to bring legal action against the state in civil matters.

Seeing widespread domestic and international support for the reforms Saeed was introducing, several cabinet ministers who had been working in the country’s dictatorial setup, jumped onto the reformist bandwagon. This led to parallel reforms in several other fronts. This reformist pandora’s box soon led to the defeat of the conservative elements in the government.

References

External links 

 Official website
 Chambers Inn website
 Premier Property website
 Articles published in the Guardian website

Maldivian lawyers
Maldivian Muslims
Living people
Year of birth missing (living people)
Attorneys General of the Maldives
Dhivehi Rayyithunge Party politicians
Government ministers of the Maldives
International Islamic University Malaysia alumni